Vaseem Khan (born 1973) is a British writer, author of the Baby Ganesh Detective Agency novels – a series of crime novels set in India – featuring retired Mumbai police Inspector Ashwin Chopra and his sidekick, a baby elephant named Ganesha. Vaseem had won the Shamus Award and the Eastern Eye's Arts Culture & Theatre Awards for Literature.

Biography 

Khan was born in the London Borough of Newham, studied at the Coopers' Company and Coborn School in Upminster, Havering, did A-Levels at Newham College, before studying Accounting and Finance at the London School of Economics and Political Science. He subsequently spent a decade on the subcontinent working as a management consultant to an Indian hotel group building environmentally-friendly hotels around the country, called ECOTELS. The flagship hotel is called The Orchid, An Ecotel and is located in Mumbai. He returned to the UK in 2006 and has since worked at University College London for the Department of Security and Crime Science. The department attempts to apply science and engineering to preventing, reducing and better detecting crime. It is one of the highest ranked departments in the country in its field.

The decade that Khan spent in India inspired him to write The Unexpected Inheritance of Inspector Chopra, which was taken up by literary agents A.M. Heath in 2014. Khan was subsequently offered a four-book contract by Mullholland Books, an imprint of publishers Hodder & Stoughton for the first books in this series, referred to as the Baby Ganesh Detective Agency series.

In January 2016, The Unexpected Inheritance of Inspector Chopra was selected for the Waterstones Book Club, and later named a Waterstones Paperback of the Year. It was also named as a Daily Telegraph Pick of the Week (in conjunction with WHSmith), an Amazon Best Debut, and was a top 10 best-seller in The Times Saturday review. 

In 2021 Vaseem Khan was awarded the Sapere Books Historical Dagger Award by the Crime Writer's Association.

Khan wrote for over twenty years before he was published, completing half-a-dozen unpublished novels and collecting numerous rejection slips. He uses his own example to offer advice to young writers who he recommends "write, write and then, when you're sick of it, write some more."

Works 
The Unexpected Inheritance of Inspector Chopra is the first novel in the Baby Ganesh Detective Agency series, in which newly retired Inspector Chopra investigates the suspicious drowning of a poor local boy, a case no one seems to want solved. At the same time he comes to grips with the surreal situation of being sent a baby elephant by his long-lost uncle. Published in August 2015, it went on to become a Times best-seller. Vaseem has stated that his objective with this series was to take readers to the heart of modern India to give them an idea of what India "looks like, feels like, sounds like, smells like, even tastes like".

The second novel in the series is entitled The Perplexing Theft of the Jewel in the Crown. The plot of the novel revolves around the theft of the world's most famous diamond – the Koh-i-Noor, originally mined in India before being appropriated by the British and handed to Queen Victoria during the Raj. In the novel the Crown Jewels are brought to India for a special exhibition. A daring robbery sees the Koh-i-Noor stolen and Chopra and Ganesha called in to try and recover the great diamond.

In the third contracted novel in the series The Strange Disappearance of a Bollywood Star Chopra and Ganesha are on the trail of a kidnapped Indian film actor, and in the fourth Murder at the Grand Raj Palace they tackle the murder of an American billionaire at India's most iconic hotel. The fifth in the series, Bad Day at the Vulture Club, sees Chopra investigating the death of a wealthy man from the Parsee community. The Parsees do not bury or cremate their dead. They leave them out in stone structures called Towers of Silence for vultures to consume in a process called excarnation.

On his decision to include an elephant as Chopra's sidekick Vaseem has said: "I thought it would be different and fun to cast an elephant in a crime-fighting role. On a purely practical level elephants possess all the qualities of the best detectives. They're highly intelligent, and have those amazing memories – that's not a myth. They also have a wide range of emotions, which is important to me as a writer because my novel isn't just about the crimes but about the dynamic between Inspector Chopra, this rigid, middle-aged policeman, this baby elephant who he is forced to adopt, and his irrepressible wife, Poppy."

In 2020, Midnight at Malabar House was published, introducing India’s first female police detective, Persis Wadia. The story is set in Bombay, 1950. As India stands on the eve of becoming a republic, Persis is tasked to investigate the murder of senior British diplomat Sir James Herriot. Vaseem Khan won the Crime Writers Association Historical Crime Dagger award for 2021 for his novel, Midnight at Malabar House. 

In 2021, the second novel Dying Day was published. Set in Bombay, 1950 again one of the world’s great treasures, a six-hundred-year-old copy of Dante’s The Divine Comedy, has been safely housed at Bombay’s Asiatic Society for over a century. But when it vanishes, together with the man charged with its care, British scholar and war hero, John Healy, the case lands on Inspector Persis Wadia’s desk.

Bibliography 
Baby Ganesh Detective Agency novels
 2015: The Unexpected Inheritance of Inspector Chopra
 2016: The Perplexing Theft of the Jewel in the Crown
 2017: The Strange Disappearance of a Bollywood Star 
 2018: Murder at the Grand Raj Palace
 2019: Bad Day at the Vulture Club

Baby Ganesh Detective Agency novellas
 2018: Inspector Chopra & the Million Dollar Motor Car 
 2019: Last Victim of the Monsoon Express

Malabar House series
 2020: Midnight at Malabar House
 2021: The Dying Day
 2022: The Lost Man of Bombay

References

British male novelists
1973 births
Writers from London
Living people
Alumni of the London School of Economics
21st-century British novelists
21st-century English male writers
British mystery writers
People from the London Borough of Newham
British people of Indian descent
British people of Pakistani descent
People associated with University College London